Gretzinger is a surname of German origin. Notable people with the surname include:

Bert Gretzinger (born 1951), Canadian curler
Jerry Gretzinger (born 1942), American folk artist and fashion designer
Steffany Gretzinger, American singer-songwriter

References

Surnames of German origin